Legionnaires 3 is a four-issue comic book limited series published by DC Comics in 1986, the second limited series to feature the Legion of Super-Heroes. It was written by Keith Giffen and Mindy Newell, pencilled by Ernie Colón, and inked by Karl Kesel. The series pits the Legion's three founders against one of their deadliest enemies, the Time Trapper.

Plot
In his citadel at the End of Time, the Time Trapper plays a game of chess with Brainiac, the intergalactic android criminal from the 20th century. He interrupts the game to confront the Controller who once masqueraded as him and was captured by the Legion of Super-Heroes. The Trapper previously saved the doppelganger from being destroyed in the Crisis, only to now kill him. Obsessed with defeating the Legion, the Trapper observes the moment in time that gave birth to the team: the attempted assassination of billionaire R. J. Brande, which is foiled by Rokk Krinn (Cosmic Boy), Imra Ardeen (Saturn Girl) and Garth Ranzz (Lightning Lad). He decides that Lightning Lad is the group’s weak link, and that the plan to destroy the Legion will focus upon him.

In Metropolis, the Legion's three founders, now retired from active duty, enjoy an evening at the Ranzz home when they are attacked by the Time Trapper’s militia. While they successfully repel the soldiers (who are immediately killed by the Trapper), the heroes soon realize that the entire attack was a diversion which allowed one of the soldiers to kidnap Lightning Lad and Saturn Girl's baby son Graym Ranzz. In the child's place is a doll wrapped in a blanket containing a message: "Only four players in this game — any Legion interference and the child dies!"

Lightning Lad's twin sister Lightning Lass arrives for a visit, but he concocts a story to keep her away. Upon leaving to rendezvous with Cosmic Boy, he and Saturn Girl must avoid Colossal Boy and his wife Yera. Sneaking into the Time Institute, the three founders seek the aid of honorary Legionnaire Rond Vidar in obtaining a time-travelling device, without revealing anything about Graym's kidnapping. When Rond refuses, Saturn Girl uses her mental powers to render him unconscious. The three of them steal the Time Cube, disappearing into the timestream. Unexpectedly finding a gap in the Trapper's Iron Curtain of Time, they arrive at the End of Time. They are soon captured by the Trapper's militia, with Lightning Lad imprisoned separately from his wife and best friend. Cosmic Boy and Saturn Girl escape from their cell and — after a perilous journey through the Citadel — discover baby Graym, completely unharmed. It is only then that they realize that the Trapper’s true target all along has been Lightning Lad.

The Time Trapper subjects Lightning Lad to a variety of psychological attacks, in an attempt to crush his spirit and his sanity. After a series of illusions fails to break the Legionnaire, the Trapper reveals that he caused the shuttle accident that killed Lightning Lad's parents years earlier. Rather than destroying the Legionnaire, the revelation allows him to call upon an inner strength that he did not realize he had, and vow to make the Trapper pay for his parents' deaths. In the very next instant, the three founders and baby Graym are all returned to the Ranzz home in 30th century Metropolis. At the End of Time, the Trapper concedes momentary defeat, noting that "there will be other games".

References

Legion of Super-Heroes storylines
1986 comics debuts
Comics about time travel
Comics by Keith Giffen